The Old Charles Town Historic District comprises more than three hundred structures, primarily residences, in Charles Town, West Virginia.  In contrast to the mainly commercial Downtown Charles Town Historic District, the Old Charles Town Historic District includes many early houses, some of log construction.  Later houses are in the Federal style, with Italianate and Greek Revival buildings.  A number of Second Empire and Victorian homes are present.

The most notable house in the district is Hunter Hill, the house of Andrew Hunter, chief prosecutor of John Brown.  Built in 1820, the house was destroyed during the American Civil War by his Unionist cousin David Hunter, and was rebuilt in 1865.

References

Georgian architecture in West Virginia
Federal architecture in West Virginia
Greek Revival architecture in West Virginia
Italianate architecture in West Virginia
Second Empire architecture in West Virginia
Victorian architecture in West Virginia
National Register of Historic Places in Jefferson County, West Virginia
Historic districts in Jefferson County, West Virginia
Commercial buildings on the National Register of Historic Places in West Virginia
Houses on the National Register of Historic Places in West Virginia
Houses in Jefferson County, West Virginia
Historic districts on the National Register of Historic Places in West Virginia
Log buildings and structures on the National Register of Historic Places in West Virginia